Mungarra Power Station is a power station 50 km south-east of Geraldton, Western Australia. It is natural gas powered with three gas turbines that together generate a total capacity of 112 MW of electricity.

The station was commissioned in 1990.

Notes

External links 

Verve Energy page on Mungarra Power Station

Natural gas-fired power stations in Western Australia